A list of examples of transdifferentiation:

Mouse fibroblasts, chondroblasts, and pigmented retinal epithelial cells → myoblasts (MyoD)
Fibroblasts → melanocytes (MITF)
Glial cells → neurons (Pax6)
Erythorid-megakaryocytic cells → monocytic cells (SPI1/PU.1)
B-cell progenitors → functional macrophages (C/EBPα)
Rat hepatic cell line → insulin-producing cells (Pdx1 and Ngn3)
Fibroblasts → macrophage-like cells (PU.1 and C/EBPα or C/EBPβ)
Postnatal cardiac and dermal fibroblasts → cardiomyocytes (Gata4, myocyte enhancer factor 2C, and Tbx5)
Fibroblasts → heptaocyte-like cells (Gata4, Hnf1alpha, and Foxa3) or (Hnf4alpha and Foxa1, Foxa2 or Foxa3)
Fibroblasts → neurons (Ascl1, Pou3f2/Brn2, and Myt1l)
Human fibroblasts → neurons (Ascl1, Brn2, Mytl1, and NeuroD) or (miR-9/9-124, Neurod2, Ascl1, and Myt1l)
Human fibroblasts → functional neurons (miR-124, Myt1l and Brn2)
Fibroblasts → dopaminergic neurons (Ascl1, Brn2, Myt1l, Lmx1a, and FoxA2) or (Ascl1, Nurr1, and Lmx1a) 
Astrocytes → dopaminergic neurons (Ascl1, Lmx1b, Nurr1)

See also
Transdifferentiation
Induced stem cells

References

Histology
Induced stem cells